Luisito is a hypocorism of the Spanish name Luis, which may also be found as a given name. Notable people include:

Luisito Campisi (born 1987), Italian footballer 
Luisito Comunica (born 1991), Mexican YouTuber 
Luisito Espinosa (born 1967), Filipino boxer
Luisito Martí (1945–2010), Dominican musician, comedian, actor, producer and television host
Luisito Pié (born 1994), Dominican taekwondo athlete
Luisito Rey (1945–1992), Spanish singer-songwriter
Luisito Vigoreaux (born 1951), Puerto Rican actor and producer 

Spanish-language hypocorisms